The R600 road is a regional road in County Cork in Ireland. From west to east, it starts in the north of Clonakilty, going through Timoleague, Ballinspittle, Kinsale, Belgooly, and ending at Cork Airport, where the road continues as the N27 to Cork city centre and the N40 South Ring Road.

Sections of the R600 are way-marked as part the Wild Atlantic Way tourist route.

See also 
Roads in Ireland

References

External links
Roads Act 1993 (Classification of Regional Roads) Order 2006 – Department of Transport

Regional roads in the Republic of Ireland
Roads in County Cork